Albert Steinmetz (28 December 1909 – 8 August 1984) was a German sprinter. He competed in the men's 200 metres at the 1936 Summer Olympics.

References

External links
 

1909 births
1984 deaths
Athletes (track and field) at the 1936 Summer Olympics
German male sprinters
Olympic athletes of Germany
Place of birth missing